Roman Loranc is a traditional black-and-white photographer from Poland.

Early life
Roman Loranc was born near Bielsko-Biala and lived in Poland during the communist era. When he was 26 years old, he immigrated to Madison, Wisconsin. Very soon afterwards, he moved to Modesto, California, and he now resides in Northern California.  He began his journey as an artist in the 1960s when his godparents gave him a 35mm format Druch camera for his first communion.  The camera broke not long afterwards, but from that moment on, Roman felt incredibly drawn to photography; because it gave him, as he describes "the ability to slice a moment out of time and hold it as a print in my hands". Also, in his words, he "soon came to feel a consuming fascination with the chemical photographic process that, after exposure to light and immersion in developer, allows grains of silver to form first on the negative and then again on a final print."

Environmental awareness
Roman Loranc's landscape photographs have helped to bring attention to the unfavorable environmental changes occurring in California, such as the disappearance of wetlands. He stated in an interview with Black and White magazine that he hopes when people see his photographs they will want to help protect and preserve these fragile lands which serve various purposes including providing a habitat for endangered wildlife.

Photographic technique
Loranc uses a 4x5 Linhof field camera which gives his work superb detail. He then produces silver gelatin prints, and spots and mounts each print himself. He describes how he learned the process of producing a print, "At first I learned by doing things on my own. I didn't have the wonderful books by Ansel Adams, or the technical manuals by Kodak, but what I did have were photography history books that described chemical formulas for developers, stop baths and fixers and with that knowledge I began processing my film and printing my negatives".
He now teaches photography workshops at his studio located near Mount Shasta.

Works
A few of Roman Loranc's notable works are Private Road with Clouds, Two Hearted Oak, Absolution and Billowing Clouds over Bay Bridge.  His first solo book, Two Hearted Oak was released in 2003 and focuses primarily on his peaceful images of the wetlands in California's Central Valley. Loranc's second book Fractal Dreams is a collection of two decades of his work from his travels through Europe and around California.

Photographic books
 Traces, 2018. Poems by Robert Lax, Essay by Anthony Bannon, published by Roman Loranc Photography Studio
 Absolution; Fifty Photographs from Europe, 2013, Poem by Pablo Neruda, Essay by Anthony Bannon, published by Photography West Graphics, Inc.
 Fractal Dreams; Photographs from Two Decades, 2009, published by Photography West Graphics, Inc.
 Two Hearted Oak, The Photography of Roman Loranc, 2003, published by Heyday Books, Berkeley.

Awards
2014, Carnegie Arts Center Distinguished Artist.
2013, Absolution: Fifty Photographs from Europe received the prestigious United States Literary Award in the category of Fine Art Photography.

References

Year of birth missing (living people)
Living people
American photographers
Polish emigrants to the United States